XTAR, LLC is a commercial satellite operator exclusively providing services in the X band frequency range, which is the communications cornerstone of today's military, diplomatic, humanitarian and emergency disaster response operations. A privately owned and operated company, XTAR supports the critical satellite communications needs of governments around the world through its two X-band payloads. The XTAR satellites were designed and built by private financing. Loral Space & Communications, Inc. owns the majority share. XTAR is headquartered in Ashburn, VA.

With its high-powered 72 MHz transponders and global, fixed and steerable beams, XTAR provides over 4 GB of secure X-band capacity with coverage from Denver east to Singapore. The system can accommodate massive wideband data requirements and provides overlapping coverage with regional redundancy for increased service and reliability.

XTAR bandwidth is not application-specific; it can support and transmit to any one of the primary architectures used by government agencies today, including fixed-to-fixed, tactical-to-tactical, reach-back, broadcast and airborne platforms.

In 2019, XTAR and Spanish governmental satellite operator Hisdesat announced plans to construct two new military communications satellites.  The new 'Next Generation' satellites will include X-band and military Ka-band capacity.

Satellite Fleet 
The XTAR fleet uses the hosted payload model, an application that is becoming increasingly used by U.S. and other governments. XTAR-EUR hosts a payload and XTAR-LANT is a hosted payload. Both satellites are built on the SSL 1300 modular platform from Space Systems/Loral and designed for 18-plus years of on-orbit operation. The spacecraft attitude maintained to within 0.02° in roll, pitch, and yaw.

XTAR-EUR

The satellite, at 29 degrees East longitude, began operations in February 2005. The XTAR-EUR satellite hosts a NATO-configurable payload designed to support an anchor European customer. The coverage area includes Eastern Brazil and the Atlantic Ocean, Europe, Africa, the Middle East, and Southeast Asia as far east as Singapore. Hisdesat and XTAR announced on July 31, 2020 that they have completed a transaction whereby Hisdesat Strategic Services SA purchased the communications satellite XTAR-EUR.

XTAR-LANT
It is a hosted payload on the Spainsat satellite. The satellite, at 30 degrees West longitude, was placed into orbit in 2006. The coverage area includes North America, South America, Europe, Africa, and the Atlantic Ocean.

Fleet Features 
 4 GB of circular polarity X-band capacity
 72 MHz transponders
 Coverage from 105 degrees West Longitude east to 120 degrees East Longitude
 Global, fixed and steerable spot beams
 Right hand and Left hand circular polarity
 On-board switching enabled
 Compatible with existing X-band terminals
 Non-preemptible service
 Encrypted command and control links

Applications and User Groups 
From training to special operations, XTAR space segment is the optimal choice for certain applications and user groups. The characteristics of X-band make it ideally suited for mobile applications where the smallest of terminals are used.  In addition, X-band is naturally resistant to rain fade, allowing it to maintain excellent performance in rain, sandstorms, cloud cover, snow and high humidity.  Airborne missions, small teams deployed with manpacks, and operations at sea, all demand exceptionally high levels of throughput and availability (>99.7%) in both transmit and receive mode. Other frequencies rarely achieve similar results with the same degree of efficiency.

With 100% terminal cross-compatibility, moving to and from a MILSAT system can be achieved in just a matter of hours, if not minutes.

These are some of the applications and users that rely heavily on XTAR capacity for their mission-critical needs:
 Intelligence, Surveillance and Reconnaissance (ISR)
 Airborne, Maritime and Special Operations Command & Control (C2)
 Small Terminal with High Throughput Missions
 MILSATCOM Users with needs for alternate, flexible or resilient commercial bandwidth that can enable COMSATCOM to MILSATCOM roaming and interoperability.
 Border Security
 Disaster Response

Contract Vehicles 
 XTAR FCSA Transponded Services Contract 
 Direct commercial contracting with XTAR
 FCSA Transponded Services reseller contracts 
 FCSA Subscription Services and CS2 contracts through XTAR partners
 Other U.S. and non-U.S. contract vehicles

Corporate Management 
 Jay Icard – President & Chief Executive Officer
 Robert McDade – Vice President & Chief Financial Officer
 James Chambers – Vice President of Engineering
 Michelle Stewart - Chief of Staff

Outside Directors 
 S. Michelle Farr  - Chairman, Government Security Committee (GSC)
 MG(R) Wayne Brock, GSC
 Peter Stauffer, GSC

Ownership 
XTAR is a privately owned company backed by majority shareholder Loral Space & Communications of New York (56%). XTAR also enjoys investment and support from minority shareholder Hisdesat Strategic Services SA (44%).

History 
XTAR, LLC was founded in 2001. It was the first commercial satellite operator to provide services in the X-band frequency range of 7.25-8.4 GHz, a band reserved exclusively for government and military users, though it launched the fleet with no government funding.  It was the brainchild of a group of leaders at Space Systems/Loral and various Spanish entities such as INSA, Hispasat, and the Ministry of Defense.

See also
 List of communication satellite companies

References

External links
 XTAR Home Page
 XTAR company blog

Communications satellite operators
Military communications
Companies based in Virginia
Communications satellites in geostationary orbit